Dança dos Famosos 2 was the second season of the Brazilian reality television show Dança dos Famosos which premiered on February 12, 2006 on Rede Globo.

Malhação cast member  Juliana Didone & Leandro Azevedo won the competition over singer Kelly Key & Marcelo Chocolate.

Couples

Elimination chart

Weekly results

Week 1
Style: Forró
Aired: February 12, 2006

Week 2
Style: Bolero
Aired: February 19, 2006

Week 3
Style: Salsa
Aired: March 5, 2006

Week 4
Style: Samba
Aired: March 12, 2006

Week 5
Style: Pasodoble
Aired: March 19, 2006

Week 6
Style: Mambo, Rock and Roll & Tango
Aired: March 26, 2006

References

External links
 Official Site 

2006 Brazilian television seasons
Season 02

pt:Dança dos Famosos